Walter Gong (July 1, 1922 – May 16, 2000) was an American academic and educational theorist who worked as a professor of natural sciences at San Jose State University (SJSU) and Brigham Young University (BYU).

Early life and education 
Gong was born and raised in Merced, California. His ancestors came to the United States from China, near the end of the 19th century. His family was involved in the laundry and grocery business. He served in the United States Navy during World War II. While serving in the Navy, he chose to use the first name of Walter.

Gong attended Stanford University, where he earned bachelor's, master's, and Ph.D. degrees. There, he met Jean Char, who introduced him to the Church of Jesus Christ of Latter-day Saints (LDS Church) and whom he later married.

Career 
Gong began his teaching career at Sequoia High School in Redwood City, California. He was a professor at SJSU from 1959 to 1993. Gong co-authored a book on mechanics with William Shockley. In the late-1970s, Gong was a professor at BYU. He also taught at Ricks College and did teaching work with IBM and NASA. In the LDS Church, he served as a patriarch.

Personal life 
Gong and his wife, Jean, had three children. Their son, Gerrit W. Gong, is an LDS Church general authority and current member of the Quorum of the Twelve Apostles. On May 16, 2000, Gong died at age 77 from complications of diabetes.

References

External links
page on Gong's educational theories
another article mentioning Gong's educational philosophy
Stephen R. Covey. The 8th Habit Personal Workbook. Chapter 3

1922 births
2000 deaths
People from Merced, California
Stanford University alumni
Converts to Mormonism
United States Navy personnel of World War II
American leaders of the Church of Jesus Christ of Latter-day Saints
20th-century American educators
San Jose State University faculty
Brigham Young University faculty
Patriarchs (LDS Church)
American people of Chinese descent
Latter Day Saints from California